The eighteenth European Masters Athletics Championships were held in Zittau, Germany, Zgorzelec, Poland and Hrádek nad Nisou, Czech Republic, from August 16-25, 2012. The European Masters Athletics Championships serve the division of the sport of athletics for people over 35 years of age, referred to as masters athletics.

The championships were held in three locations near the German/Czech/Polish border. 

Less countries participated compared with the last championships in Nyiregyhaza, but just over 700 more athletes participated, giving it the third greatest attendance of any championship run by European Masters Athletics ever.

Results

100 metres

200 metres

400 metres

800 metres

1500 metres

5000 metres

10000 metres

110 metres hurdles

400 metres hurdles

3000 metres steeplechase

4x100 metres relay

4x400 metres relay

Marathon

High jump

Pole vault

Long jump

Triple jump

Shot put

Discus throw

Hammer throw

Javelin throw

Weight throw

Throws pentathlon

Decathlon

5000 metre track race walk

20000 metre road race walk

References 

 

2012 European Masters Athletics Championships